Heath Daniel McNease is an American Christian hip hop and folk rock musician who is primarily a worship musician in the Christian music movement. He released four albums with 7Spin Music, two of those hip hop releases, The Heath McNease Fanclub Meets in 2007 and The Gun Show in 2010, while he released two folk rock roots releases, The House Always Wins in 2010 and Shine On in 2010. The remainder of his albums have been released independently. He released four hip hop albums, Straight Outta Console: The Nintendo Thumb Mixtape in 2011, Thrift Store Jesus in 2012, Jesus Shuttlesworth: The Mixtape and The Weight of Glory: Second Edition (A Hip Hop Remix Inspired by the Works of C.S. Lewis) in 2013, and Among Thieves in 2014, while two were folk rock roots releases, The Weight of Glory - Songs Inspired by the Works of C.S. Lewis in 2012, and Fort Wayne in 2014.

Early life
McNease was born Heath Daniel McNease in Colquitt, Georgia. His parents raised him and his siblings in the church, where his father was a deacon, and his mother was the choir director. The hip hop influence was imparted to him by his two older brothers, while a cousin, and his mother in particular, got him listening to folk rock music. McNease graduated post-secondary school from Miller County High School, and went on to graduate from Bainbridge State College. Two years later he obtained his Bachelor of Fine Arts degree from Valdosta State University.

Music career
He started his music recording career in 2005, with his first studio album, The Heath McNease Fanclub Meets Tonight, which was released by 7Spin Music on April 24, 2007. The subsequent two studio albums, 'Shine On and The Gun Show, were released on the same day, May 4, 2010, from 7Spin Music. His next release – The House Always Wins – released by 7Spin Music on February 22, 2011, was his last release with the aforementioned label. The next release, a mix tape, Straight Outta Console: The Nintendo Thumb Mixtape, was independently released on July 3, 2011, and all of his forthcoming releases would be released independently. His follow-up release, Thrift Store Jesus, was released on February 28, 2012. The forthcoming release, The Weight of Glory - Songs Inspired by the Works of C.S. Lewis, was released on August 14, 2012. He released Jesus Shuttlesworth: The Mixtape, another mix tape, on February 19, 2013. There was another release, on January 10, 2013, The Weight of Glory: Second Edition (A Hip Hop Remix Inspired by the Works of CS Lewis). He released two albums in 2014, the first, Fort Wayne, on September 23. The second, Among Thieves, was released on November 18. He released, an extended play, Salem Songs, his third EP on October 22, 2015.

Discography
Studio albums
 The Heath McNease Fan Club Meets Tonight (April 24, 2007, 7Spin, hip hop)
 Shine On (May 4, 2010, 7Spin, folk rock)
 The Gun Show (May 4, 2010, 7Spin, hip hop)
 The House Always Wins (February 22, 2011, folk rock)
Independent albums
 Thrift Store Jesus (February 28, 2012, hip hop)
 The Weight of Glory - Songs Inspired by the Works of C.S. Lewis (August 14, 2012, folk rock)
 The Weight of Glory: Second Edition (A Hip Hop Remix Inspired by the Works of C.S. Lewis) (January 10, 2013, hip hop)
 Fort Wayne (September 23, 2014, folk rock)
 Among Thieves (November 18, 2014, hip hop)
Mix tapes
 Straight Outta Console: The Nintendo Thumb Mixtape (July 3, 2011, hip hop)
 Jesus Shuttlesworth: The Mixtape (December 11, 2012, hip hop)
EPs
 Losing Daylight (October 30, 2012, independent, folk rock)
 Gold (September 18, 2015, Collaboration with Jetty Rae, as Pen Pals)
 Salem Songs (October 22, 2015, independent, folk rock)
 "Who Knows? Who Cares? (August 10, 2016, independent, hip hop)

References

External links
 Official website

Living people
American performers of Christian music
Musicians from Georgia (U.S. state)
Songwriters from Georgia (U.S. state)
People from Colquitt, Georgia
Valdosta State University alumni
Performers of Christian hip hop music
Year of birth missing (living people)
Pen Pals (band) members